A mote is a small bit of substance, such as a fleck or particle.

Mote may also refer to:

Art and entertainment
 The Motes, a Canadian indie-rock band active in the 1990s
 "Mote", a song by Sonic Youth from their 1990 album Goo
 "Mote", a song by The Faint on the 2001 vinyl EP recording Mote/Dust 
 Mote, a fairy character in A Midsummer Night's Dream
 The Mote and the Beam, a parable
 The Mote in God's Eye, a science fiction novel

Other uses
 Mote (name) (including a list of people with the name)
 Mote (food), various types of cooked grains consumed in South America
 Mote con huesillo, a non-alcoholic drink from Chile
 Mote spoon, a type of spoon used when preparing tea
 Mote (sensor), a node in a wireless sensor network
 Mote Park, a park in Maidstone, England
 Mote Park (cricket ground), the home ground of The Mote Cricket Club within the park
 Mote Marine Laboratory, a marine research organization in Sarasota, Florida, US

See also
 Moat (disambiguation)
 Moot (disambiguation)
 Mot (disambiguation)
 Motte (disambiguation)